The Tahoranui River is a river of the Northland Region of New Zealand's North Island. It flows northeast from its origins near he settlement of Te Whau to reach the Pacific Ocean at Takou Bay, 10 kilometres north of Kerikeri.

See also
List of rivers of New Zealand

References

Far North District
Rivers of the Northland Region
Rivers of New Zealand